Laurent Beauvais (born 24 June 1952) is a French politician and the former President of the Regional Council of Lower Normandy. He is a member of the Socialist Party.

Born in Nogent-le-Rotrou, Eure-et-Loir, he grew up in Évreux then Mortrée near Argentan (Orne).

He joined the Socialist Party at age 21 and he was elected to the Mortrée municipal council in 1977. He worked in the cabinets of various Socialist Research Ministers, and was a member of the French National Centre for Scientific Research (CNRS). He did not run for re-election in Mortrée in 1989, choosing to run on the list of François Doubin (MRG) in Argentan. Following Doubin's election, he became deputy mayor. Elected opposition regional councillor in 1998, elected to lead the Communauté de communes of Argentan in 2001, he finally became vice-president of the Lower Normandy Regional Council; responsible for Education, Higher Education and Research under Socialist President Philippe Duron.

Following Philippe Duron's election as Mayor of Caen, he succeeded him as President of the Regional Council. He will run for a full term in his own right as the PS' top candidate in the region in the 2010 regional elections.

References

1952 births
Living people
People from Nogent-le-Rotrou
Politicians from Normandy
Presidents of French regions and overseas collectivities
21st-century French politicians
Socialist Party (France) politicians
University of Caen Normandy alumni
Paris Dauphine University alumni
Sciences Po alumni